Steve O'Connor played 290 games in the Australian National Soccer League (NSL) and represented Australia in the national team with 44 Socceroo appearances.

Background
Stephen (Steve) joined Revesby Rovers as a 7-year-old and played representative soccer for Bankstown at 8 years old and in consecutive years up until the age of 15. Steve was then chosen in the New South Wales team at 16 and also played 1st grade for Bankstown the same year.  During this time Steve also played representative basketball and had to make a decision on which sport to concentrate on, choosing soccer.

He then joined the Hakoah Club making his 1st grade appearance as a 17-year-old in a team with such players as John Watkiss, Danny Walsh, Ray Baartz, Alan Marnoch and Jimmy McKay. O'Connor played 290 games in the Australian National Soccer League (NSL) He played with Sydney City (Hakoah) for 15 years in which time the Club won 4 national titles. When Sydney City folded in 1987 Steve was signed by St George and went on to win another National Championship.

International Playing Career

O'Connor represented Australia in the national team with 44 Socceroo appearances.

Coaching career
Australian Institute of Sport

In 1990 Steve was appointed Assistant Coach at the AIS Men's Football Program where he coached the likes of Mark Viduka, Josip Skoko, Josip Simunic, Craig Moore, Kevin Muscat, Lucas Neill, Hayden Foxe, John Aloisi, Clint Bolten to name a few. During this time he completed the Level 3 Coaching Accreditation and the AIS High Performance Coaching Diploma.

Technical Director - New South Wales Soccer Federation

From 1994 to '96 Steve became TD of NSW and started the NTC Development Program and Zone Program concept of which he was Head Coach and included a young Brett Emerton and Harry Kewell.

Head Coach, Australian Institute of Sport 1996-2008

Steve was Head Coach of the AIS Men's Football Program for 12 years. During that time he was assistant coach with the U/17, U/20 and U/23 National Teams at various times and also the U/20 National Coach Between 1996 and 2008 Steve brought into the AIS and further developed Vince Grella, Mark Bresciano, Simon Colosimo, Josh Kennedy, Brett Emerton, Carl Valeri, James Holland, Billy Celevski, Nick Ward, Stu Musialik, Alex Brosque, Jobe Wheelhouse, Luke Wilkshire, Ljubo Milicovic, Michael Marrone, Nikolai Topor Stanley, Nathan Burns, Evan Burger, [[Kofi Danning]|Ryan Grant]], Nikita Rukavytja, Sebastian Ryall, Tando Velapi, Jimmy Downey, Mitchel Langerac to name a few. During this time Steve got his Community Accreditation Senior Licence and Advanced Accreditation A Licence.

Australia National Under 20 Association Football Team  - Young Socceroos  2007 - 2008

Steve took the team to the first round of Asian qualifiers for the Youth World Cup

Technical Director & Youth Coach at Sydney FC

In 2008 Steve resigned from the AIS to join Sydney FC as Technical Director and Youth Coach. The youth team won the inaugural National Youth League title and Grand Final, on top of this, five players from the youth team progressed to the U/20 National Team and received senior A League contracts.

"I love helping serious young footballers not only improve their performance but understand what commitment it takes to make it as a professional footballer." The one thing that stands out about all the players mentioned above is not only were they talented but they always wanted to improve and work on their game. Once they understood how, they would constantly evaluate their performance for improvement. The whole process of developing them became very cooperative between the coaching staff and the player. They would set the standards.

Hong Kong Football Association

On 17 April 2012, the Hong Kong Football Association announced that Steve O'Connor will join as Technical Director. He will take up his new post in early May. Steve will be tasked with improving the standards of local coaching, referee development, community and youth football activities and women's football. He will also oversee the implementation of elite player development pathways from grassroots football to senior international level.

Australian Football Hall of Fame

In 2003, Steve O'Connor was inducted into the Australian Football Hall of Fame, which was established in 1999 to pay tribute to Australia's football greats and to recognise exceptional achievements of players, coaches, referees, administrators, and media representatives.

References

 Australian Football Hall of Fame

External links
 International Football Institute

Living people
Australian soccer players
Australia international soccer players
Association football defenders
Australian Institute of Sport coaches
Year of birth missing (living people)